Callinectes ornatus is a species of swimming crab in the genus Callinectes. It can be distinguished from the closely related Atlantic blue crab (Callinectes sapidus) by the presence of six frontal teeth on the carapace, compared with only four for C. sapidus.

Their shells are light yellow-brown to red-brown in color. The lower tips of the claws are blue. The two spikes on each side of their shells are not as long as in blue crabs. They can be found in the western Atlantic Ocean, as well the Caribbean coastlines. Their diet consists of small crustaceans and small fish. They are also scavengers.

References

Further reading

Portunoidea
Crustaceans of the Atlantic Ocean
Crustaceans of North America
Crustaceans of the United States
Crustaceans described in 1863